The Athletics Tournament at the 1983 Summer Universiade took place in the Commonwealth Stadium in Edmonton, Alberta, Canada in July 1983, shortly before the inaugural World Championships in Helsinki, Finland. There was one new event, the women's marathon.

Medal summary

Men's

Women's events

Medal table

See also
 1983 in athletics (track and field)

References
 Results on HickokSports
 Men's medallists
 Women's medallists

 
Athletics at the Summer Universiade
Uni
1983 Summer Universiade
International track and field competitions hosted by Canada